Spanish Ranch Creek is a small river in San Mateo County, California. 

Notes

Rivers of San Mateo County, California
Rivers of Northern California